The 2014–15 NJIT Highlanders women's basketball team will represent New Jersey Institute of Technology during the 2014–15 NCAA Division I women's basketball season. The Highlanders, led by third year head coach Steve Lanpher, play their home games at the Fleisher Center and were in their second year as an Independent after the Great West Conference folded. They finished the season 12–17. This was their final season as being Independent as they move to the Atlantic Sun Conference on July 1, 2015.

Roster

Media
NJIT will provide audio of all home contests on Highlanders-All Access and video of select home contests with Matt Provence and Michael Ventola calling the action. Currently no radio is expected for the games. Audio for most road games can be found on the opponents website.

Schedule
Source:

|-
!colspan=9 style="background:#FF0000; color:#FFFFFF;"| Regular Season

See also
 2014–15 NJIT Highlanders men's basketball team

References

NJIT Highlanders
NJIT Highlanders women's basketball seasons
NJIT Highlanders Women's B
NJIT Highlanders Women's B